This is a list of Polish television related events from 2010.

Events
13 June - BrzydUla actress Julia Kamińska and her partner Rafał Maserak win the eleventh series of Taniec z Gwiazdami.
27 November - 12-year-old singer Magda Welc wins the third series of Mam talent!.
28 November - Pole vaulter Monika Pyrek and her partner Robert Rowiński win the twelfth series of Taniec z Gwiazdami.

Debuts

International

Television shows

1990s
Klan (1997–present)

2000s
M jak miłość (2000–present)
Na Wspólnej (2003–present)
Pierwsza miłość (2004–present)
Dzień Dobry TVN (2005–present)
Taniec z gwiazdami (2005-2011, 2014–present)
Mam talent! (2008–present)

Ending this year

Births

Deaths

See also
2010 in Poland